An Ideal City (French Une ville idéale) is an 1875 book by Jules Verne. The book is about music recitals being heard all over the world after being transmitted from the wires connected to an artists's piano.

References

Novels by Jules Verne
1875 French novels